Laurel Frances Lee (née Moore; born March 26, 1974) is an American lawyer and politician serving as the U.S. representatives for Florida's 15th congressional district since 2023. She served as Secretary of State of Florida from January 2019 to May 2022. Before serving as secretary of state, Lee was a judge on Florida's Thirteenth Judicial Circuit.

Legal career
Lee began her legal career as an attorney for the Carlton Fields law firm in 2003 before becoming an assistant public defender in 2005. Lee also served as an Assistant U.S. Attorney for the Middle District of Florida from 2007 until her appointment by then-Governor Rick Scott to a judgeship on the Hillsborough County Circuit Court in 2013. She was unopposed for election to a full six-year term in 2014.

Florida Secretary of State
Lee was appointed Florida Secretary of State by Governor Ron DeSantis on January 28, 2019, replacing Mike Ertel, who resigned after less than a month in office when a 2005 photo of him wearing blackface as part of a Halloween costume as a Hurricane Katrina victim surfaced.

In October 2020, weeks before the 2020 election, Lee sought to purge felons from voter rolls if they had outstanding court debts. Politico called the move "a surprise, late-hour move that comes after more than 2 million people already have voted in the presidential battleground." Lee's decision was not distributed to the wider public, only to local election officials.

In December 2021, Lee made a criminal referral to Florida Attorney General Ashley Moody seeking an investigation into potentially fraudulent signatures collected by Las Vegas Sands in a petition drive to get a constitutional amendment on the ballot for the November 2022 elections that would expand casino gambling.

On May 12, 2022, Lee announced she was resigning effective four days later, seven months before the 2022 election. She did not offer a reason for resigning. She won the general election by a wide margin.

Personal life
Lee is married to Tom Lee, a former member of the Florida Senate. They have three children. They live in Brandon, Florida. Lee is Protestant.

References

External links

 Congresswoman Laurel Lee official U.S. House website
 Campaign website
 
 

|-

|-

 

1970s births
Living people
20th-century American lawyers
20th-century American women lawyers
21st-century American judges
21st-century American lawyers
21st-century American politicians
21st-century American women judges
21st-century American women lawyers
21st-century American women politicians
American Protestants
Assistant United States Attorneys
Christians from Florida
Female members of the United States House of Representatives
Florida Republicans
Florida state court judges
Fredric G. Levin College of Law alumni
Protestants from Florida
Public defenders
Republican Party members of the United States House of Representatives from Florida
Secretaries of State of Florida
University of Florida alumni
Women in Florida politics
Year of birth missing (living people)